Linked Data Platform (LDP) is a linked data specification defining a set of integration patterns for building RESTful HTTP services that are capable of read/write of RDF data.

The Linked Data Platform allows use of RESTful HTTP to consume, create, update and delete both RDF and non-RDF resources. In addition, it defines a set of "container" constructs – buckets into which documents can be added with a relationship between the bucket and the object similar to the relationship between a blog and its constituent blog posts.

History 
LDP evolved from work at IBM's Rational Product Group for application integration. Starting in 2010, IBM looked at linked data for application lifecycle management and sought what was an alternative means for read–write linked data.

IBM joined with the W3C in June 2012 to form a W3C working group, which operated until July 2015. 
On 26 February 2015, the W3C Linked Data Platform 1.0 was approved as a W3C Recommendation.

Implementation 
Read–write linked data was previously described using WebDAV and
SPARUL by Tim Berners-Lee in his design issues  that built upon 
his four principles for linked data.

The Linked Data Platform includes Tim Berners-Lee's four principles, and focuses on the
following concepts.

LDP resources (LDPR) 
 HTTP and RDF techniques to read and write linked data
 Resources can be created, modified, deleted and read using standard HTTP methods (i.e., POST, PUT, PATCH, DELETE, GET)
 Cover "RDF sources" as well as "binary resources"

LDP containers (LDPC) 
 An LDPR to which you POST to create new things, GET to find existing things
 Similar to what AtomPub does for XML
 Available in three flavors: BasicContainer, DirectContainer, and IndirectContainer

Paging and ordering 
 A mechanism to get the content of a LDPC in chunks and specify the order in which the content is sorted

LDP and WebDAV relationship 
LDP is not a file system, but it uses linked data to produce the kind of information that can be used to create a modern file system abstraction for interacting with HTTP-accessible resources (colloquially referred to as "Web resources").

In contrast, WebDAV is a "set of extensions to the HTTP protocol which allows users to collaboratively edit and manage files on remote web servers".

However, LDP can be used with WebDAV. For example, there are live LDP containers in the wild, identified by linked data URIs, that can also function as WebDAV endpoints (i.e., mountable by any WebDAV compliant user agent).

See also 
 Apache Marmotta
 Fedora Commons

References

External links 
 Linked Data Platform 1.0, W3C
 Linked Data Platform 1.0 Primer, W3C
 Linked Data Platform Use Cases and Requirements, W3C
 LDP Implementations, W3C Wiki

Semantic Web
Resource Description Framework
Hypertext Transfer Protocol